Renmin Subdistrict  is a subdistrict situated in Shigu District, Hengyang, Hunan, China. , it administers the following four residential neighborhoods:
Renmin Road Community
Xiangbei Community
Xiangyang Community
Zhengyang Community

See also
List of township-level divisions of Hunan

References

Subdistricts of Hunan
Shigu District